, abbreviated as TGU, is a Japanese private university located in Miyoshi, Aichi within the Chubu  of Japan.
It has a campus in Tempaku-ku, Nagoya.The predecessor of the school was founded in 1888 and was chartered as a university in 1995.

The advantages of Tokai Gakuen(Gakkō Hōjin) Group, including Tokai Gakuen University, are more than 130 years old, and more than 100,000 alumni are active in various fields such as politics, economy, culture, and medicine.
Tokai Gakuen University conducts thorough small-group education and opens seminars for specialized research in small classes from the first year. Acquire basic knowledge and skills directly related to the future.

Presidents
 Takehisa Matsubara(2015-).

Campus
There are two campuses:

Miyoshi Campus (Miyoshi, Aichi)
Nagoya Campus (Tenpaku-ku, Nagoya)

Organization

Undergraduate programs
TGU has six undergraduate faculties.
The faculties are: 

 School of Business Management
Department of Business Management
 School of Humanities
 Department of Humanities
 School of Psychology
 Department of Psychology
 School of Education
Department of Education
 School of Sport and Health Science 
 Department of Sport and Health Science
 School of Health and Nutrition
 Department of Nutrition

Graduate programs
 Graduate School of Business Management 
 Master course

Overseas Partners

United Kingdom
    Aberystwyth University

Australia
   University of Technology Sydney-INSEARCH
   Monash University

Canada
   Queen's University
   Simon Fraser University

Taiwan
    National Taiwan Normal University

Vietnam
    Ho Chi Minh City University of Social Sciences and Humanities
    Hanoi National University of Education

References

External links
Tokai Gakuen University

Educational institutions established in 1888
1888 establishments in Japan
Private universities and colleges in Japan
Universities and colleges in Aichi Prefecture
Miyoshi, Aichi